Holmshurst Manor is a Jacobean country house near Burwash in East Sussex, England. In 1970 it was purchased by Roger Daltrey of The Who.

Description
Holmshurst lies north of Burwash Common, near Witherenden Hill, and is surrounded by farm land. The house is built of brick with stone dressings and has twenty rooms and seven bedrooms. It features a tiled roof, clustered chimneys, stone fireplaces, stained glass windows, oak paneling and a gallery seventy feet in length. Daltrey maintained the Jacobean style of the house, but also installed a sauna and Persian carpets. In the mid-1970s Daltrey designed and built Lakedown Fishery on the manor farm, and also installed a recording studio in one of the barns.

The grounds include a number of outbuildings, including two oast houses, meant for roasting hops as part of the process for brewing beer, and a granary which Daltrey converted to a garage. The manor house, oast houses and granary are listed as Grade II historical structures by English Heritage. Two cottages on the property are also listed at Grade II.

History
Holmshurst Manor was originally built by Goddard Hepden (Hebden) in 1610 and bears his initials "GH" carved in a coat-of-arms on the lintel. Hepden was born in Burwash in about 1550, the son of John Hepden and Joan Wenham. He married Anne Frye, born in about 1552 in Ringmer, the daughter of Nicholas and Elizabeth Frye. The couple married in around 1580 and raised twelve children.

References

External links
Holmshurst in 1869
Conway Collections photo
Holmshurst in People Magazine, 1975
Lakedown Trout Fishery
Census data for Holmshurst

History of East Sussex
Country houses in East Sussex
Jacobean architecture in the United Kingdom
Houses completed in 1610
Grade II listed buildings in East Sussex
Grade II listed houses
1610 establishments in England
Burwash